Saujana Impian is a township in Hulu Langat District, Selangor, Malaysia. This township is located about 2 kilometres from Kajang town.  The Impian Golf & Country Club is located within this township.

Saujana Impian were developed in phases, and as such the township is geographically separated by sub-township development as below,
Impian Jaya - Fasa 1 (Teres Dua Tingkat) & Fasa 2 (Semi-D)
Impian Gemilang - Fasa 3A (Semi-D) & Fasa 3B (Teres Dua Tingkat)
Impian Indah - Fasa 4 (Teres Dua Tingkat)
Impian Murni - Fasa 5 (Teres Dua Tingkat)
Impian Kasih - Fasa 5 (Teres Dua Tingkat)
Impian Setia - Fasa 5 (Teres Dua Tingkat)
Impian Makmur - Fasa 6C Sapphire - (Semi-D)
Impian Makmur - Fasa 7 (Apartment)

Educations
There are a few schools within the vicinity, with a mix of primary and secondary schools.

Sekolah Kebangsaan Saujana Impian (Awards: Sekolah Harapan Negara, Sekolah Cemerlang, Sekolah, Anugerah Cemerlang Kokurikulum, Anugerah Cemerlang Bilik Operasi SPBT, Anugerah Cemerlang Pengurusan NILAM, Anugerah Tawaran Baru).
Sekolah Kebangsaan Saujana Impian 2
Sekolah Menengah Kebangsaan Saujana Impian
Sekolah Menengah Sultan Abdul Aziz Shah (SAAS)

Transportation

Car
Saujana Impian is accessible through several highways. Most notable highways are Cheras–Kajang Expressway (part of Federal Route 1 system) connecting to Cheras and Kuala Lumpur, and Kajang–Seremban Highway (LEKAS) connecting to Seremban and Kuala Pilah.

Public transportation
 MRT Sungai Jernih and  MRT Bukit Dukung.

External links
Kuala Lumpur MRT Website
Saujana Impian Community Forum
Impian Jaya, Saujana Impian Blog

Hulu Langat District
Townships in Selangor